Church of St. Francis Xavier is a historic church on Minnesota Highway 61 in Grand Marais, Minnesota, United States.  The church began as a Jesuit mission from Fort William, Ontario, in 1855 to minister to the Ojibwe residents of the area.  The permanent structure was built in 1895 and was used until declining attendance forced it to close in 1936.  The Cook County Historical society restored the site between 1970 and 1974 and it was added to the National Register in 1986. The church is located in the abandoned townsite of Chippewa City.

References

External links

 St. Francis Xavier Church–Cook County Historical Society

Buildings and structures in Cook County, Minnesota
Former Roman Catholic church buildings in Minnesota
Churches on the National Register of Historic Places in Minnesota
Roman Catholic churches completed in 1917
National Register of Historic Places in Cook County, Minnesota
20th-century Roman Catholic church buildings in the United States